Coral Ross  is a former mayor of the City of Boroondara in Melbourne, Australia, board member of the Municipal Association of Victoria and Victorian president of the Australian Local Government Women's Association. She is a prominent figure in women's participation in politics, especially in local government. In recognition of her work, she was named as one of the top 100 'Women of Influence' in Australia for 2014. She was appointed a Member of the Order of Australia in the 2021 Queen's Birthday Honours.

References 

Living people
Year of birth missing (living people)
Members of the Order of Australia
Victoria (Australia) local councillors
Women mayors of places in Victoria (Australia)
Women local councillors in Australia
Mayors of places in Victoria (Australia)